Latouche-Tréville may refer to:

People

 Charles-Auguste Levassor de La Touche-Tréville (1712–1788), French Navy officer 
 Louis-Charles Le Vassor de La Touche (1709–1781), comte de La Touche, French governor of Martinique.
 Louis-René Levassor de Latouche Tréville (1745– 1804), French Vice-admiral

Other

 French ship Latouche-Tréville, one of three ships of the French Navy